Breach of Conduct, also known as Tour of Duty, is a 1994 American thriller television film directed by Tim Matheson and written by Scott Abbott. It starred Peter Coyote and Courtney Thorne-Smith.

Plot

Cast
Peter Coyote as Col. Andrew Case
Courtney Thorne-Smith as Helen Lutz
Keith Amos as Cpl. Reed
Beth Toussaint as Paula Waite
Tom Verica as Lt. Ted Lutz
Thom Vernon as Cpl. Weingart
Tom Mason as Dr. Matthew James
Todd McKee as Lt. Keith Waite
Drew Snyder as Sheriff
Tom McFadden as Deputy sheriff
John Walcutt as Gate guard Harper
Gregg Daniel as Military police officer
Bill Harper as Military police officer
Roger Hewlett as Gatehouse guard
Sharon Mendel as Gatehouse guard
Larry Nash as Squad leader
Michael Raysses as Soldier in truck
Tudi Roche as Enlisted woman
Stan Foster as Army clerk
Gina St. John as Nurse 
Joe Camareno as Waiter
Shayne Adamson as Corpsman

References

External links
 
 

1994 films
1994 television films
American thriller television films
1994 thriller films
Films scored by Terry Plumeri
Films directed by Tim Matheson
1990s American films
1990s English-language films